The 1967 Chatham Cup was the 40th annual nationwide knockout football competition in New Zealand.

The competition was run on a regional basis, with 17 regional associations holding separate qualification rounds. The winners of each of these qualification tournaments, along with the second-placed team from Auckland, qualified for the competition proper. In all, 95 teams took part in the competition, 32 from the South Island and 63 from the North Island. Note: Different sources record different numbers for the rounds of this competition, with some confusion caused by differing numbers of rounds in regional qualification.

The 1967 final
North Shore United returned to the final, this time with former international Ken Armstrong as coach. In the final they met Christchurch City - soon to change its name to Christchurch United, a recently amalgamated team featuring players who had previously been with several strong southern sides, among them future internationals Terry Haydon and Tony Gowans. The game was an exciting one. The Christchurch side dominated for the entire first half, but a combination of missed chances, the woodwork, a disallowed goal, and heroics from Shore keeper Dennis Mack kept the first half scoreless. In the second spell, Billy Rimmer scored for the Aucklanders early but the lead was soon cancelled out by a strike from Haydon. A late penalty for City was missed by Gowans, and Shore made the most of their chance by stealing a late winner through Ian Campbell.

Results

Third round

* Won by Suburbs on toss of coin
† Won by North Shore on corners
¶ Won by Western Suburbs on corners

Fourth round

Fifth round

Quarter-finals

Semi-finals

* some sources give the result as 2-1 aet

Final

References

Rec.Sport.Soccer Statistics Foundation New Zealand 1967 page
ultimatenzsoccer.com 1967 Chatham Cup page

Chatham Cup
Chatham Cup
Chatham Cup
September 1967 sports events in New Zealand